Old Kilpatrick (meaning "Patrick's church"), is a village in West Dunbartonshire, Scotland. It has an estimated population of 4,820. It belonged to the parish of Old Kilpatrick which itself was only a few thousand people strong.

The Forth and Clyde Canal separates Old Kilpatrick from the north bank of the River Clyde which is just a few metres beyond it to the south. The Great Western Road runs through the village whose immediate western neighbour, on the road and the canal, is Bowling, where the Forth and Clyde Canal meets the river. The modern A82 road runs to the north, between the village and the foot of the Kilpatrick Hills. In the 19th century it was described as being essentially a single street. It's possible the birthplace of Saint Patrick was near Old Kilpatrick.

Roman fort

The western end of the Antonine Wall is at Old Kilpatrick; the eastern end, 59 km distant, is at Bridgeness, to the east in Bo'ness on the Firth of Forth.  The route was surveyed during the 18th century, and traced to the Chapel Hill, where various Roman artefacts were found. Lottery funding has been assigned to producing replica distance markers; the West Dunbartonshire marker is to be placed at Old Kilpatrick.

In 1790, when the Forth and Clyde Canal was being constructed, the remains of a bathhouse were discovered. In 1913 the foundations of the fort, which had been conjectured as being in the vicinity, were confirmed. In 1923, during redevelopment of the area, significant archaeology was undertaken which established the size and nature of the Roman Fort. The fort, built around 81 AD, occupied an area of about four acres and was enclosed by an outer defensive wall. If the date is correct, it shows that the fort preceded the Antonine Wall by some sixty years. Internally, buildings discovered included a praetorium (headquarters), barracks and a granary. A video reconstruction of the site has been produced. Sir George Macdonald also wrote about the excavations. Major development precluded further significant excavation, and nothing is visible of the remains today; the remains lie beneath the houses of Gavinburn Gardens to the east, a large commercial building to the west and the A814 road to the north. Finds from Old Kilpatrick include several distance slabs. One distance slab by the Twentieth Legion is known to have been completed before 1684. It depicts Victory with a palm-branch in one hand and a garland in the other. It was found at Ferrydyke on the Clyde's northern bank and records the completion of 4411 feet; the last 3 Roman numerals are the same as the remaining ones on the other damaged distance slab (RIB 2206).
The slabs along with many other finds from Old Kilpatrick are now kept at the Hunterian Museum in Glasgow. For example, 19 coins have been found as well as a beaker. On 3 December 1969 a Roman votive altar was found at Old Kilpatrick. It has been scanned and a video produced. The inscription mentions the First Cohort of Baetasians, previously known to have been at Bar Hill, and also a centurion from The First Legion (Italica).

Later history

The parish system was introduced to Scotland in the 13th century. In about 1227, the church and lands of Kilpatrick were given to Paisley Abbey by Maldowen, Earl of Lennox. The parish remained under the supervision of the Abbey until the Reformation in 1560.

At the Dissolution, the Church property fell into the possession of Lord Sempill. Eventually the lands were conferred on Claude Hamilton (a boy of ten), founder of the Abercorn family. His son James Hamilton was created Lord Abercorn on 5 April 1603, then on 10 July 1606 he was made Earl of Abercorn and Lord of Paisley, Hamilton, Mountcastell and Kilpatrick.

Kilpatrick was split into two parishes – Old (Wester or West) and New Kilpatrick (also known as Easter or East) by an Act of Parliament on 16 February 1649. This division is unusual because this was a split of both the ecclesiastical and civil parishes and the wealth and stipend of the original parish was shared between the two new parishes. It was more common for new parishes to have "daughter" status, with wealth retained by the central, or cathedral church.

Old Kilpatrick was created a Burgh of barony in 1697. Its population tripled between 1755 and 1821 as the spinning and weaving industries developed. By 1831 the population was 5,800. From 1906 to 1931, Old Kilpatrick was the site of the Napier and Miller shipyard.

Today, the north end of the Erskine Bridge, which replaced the Erskine Ferry, lands just above the village, and the village is served by Kilpatrick railway station on the North Clyde Line.

There are three public houses within Old Kilpatrick; The Twisted Thistle, The Ettrick  and the Glen Lusset. The Twisted Thistle was previously known as the Telstar. After the closure of The Telstar, the building was renovated and reopened in 2014 as The Twisted Thistle.

There are two annual fêtes which are well attended. Also at the north end of Old Kilpatrick is the local school. Gavinburn Primary School (which was bombed in WW2) where they also have many fêtes annually.

The minerals edingtonite and thomsonite were first found at Old Kilpatrick.

In the early 1990s a large housing estate was constructed at the edge of Old Kilpatrick, the one estate was said to double the size of Old Kilpatrick.

The ancient graveyard surrounding the old parish church still has surviving gravestones from the 17th century.  The current building dates from 1812 and is still in use as the local Church of Scotland parish church, now linked with neighbouring Bowling Parish Church.

The local Roman Catholic church is St. Patrick's RC Church; the current parish priest is Fr. Francis Wilson. A fire in August 2015 saw the RC congregation temporarily without a place to worship, taking up the kind offer of the nearby Church of Scotland congregation to use their building, a friendly act of ecumenism in part of Scotland traditionally torn by bigotry.

There are plans to develop a marine technology hub at the former Royal Navy oil refinery and a wooded community area near the village.

Notable people
Many soldiers from Old Kilpatrick perished during the First World War.
 Colonel Andrew Geils, one time Commandant (interim Governor) of Van Diemen's Land (subsequently Tasmania) and owner of the nearby estate of Dumbuck is buried in the Parish churchyard along with several other family members
 Chris Baillie, athlete
 Bobby Finan, footballer
Ian Niall, or John McNeillie, author of The Wigtown Ploughman, was born here.
This is one of several locations that it is suggested that Saint Patrick of Ireland was captured at and enslaved in Ireland in the 5th century.
 Aidan Quinn – Fastest Deliveroo Rider in the UK 2019

See also
 Bodinbo Island
 Donald's Quay
 St Patrick's Rock

References

External links

 Video footage of Ferrydyke Quay and Bascule Bridge.
 Video footage of Donald's Quay Stables, Ferrydyke Quay.

Villages in West Dunbartonshire
Clydebank
Civil parishes of Scotland
Greater Glasgow